The 2013 British Champions Series was the third annual British Champions Series for Thoroughbred racehorses, comprising 35 of the country's top flat races.  It was sponsored by Qatari investment company, QIPCO.  As with both previous Champions Series, it was split into five divisions.  The horse rankings in each division were determined by the horses' performance ratings (as assessed by the British Horseracing Authority Official Handicapper) in QIPCO British Champions Series races throughout the season.  There were also rankings for jockeys and trainers based on a points system.

Results

Sprint

Mile

Middle Distance

Long Distance

Fillies & Mares

Final standings

Horses

Jockeys

Trainers

References

British Champions Series
British Champions Series
2013 in British sport